Alticus simplicirrus, the Marquesan rockstripper, is a species of combtooth blenny found in the central Pacific ocean, around the Marquesas Islands. This species reaches a length of  SL.

A population of blennies of this or a related species on Rarotonga has evolved to become largely terrestrial, apparently at least in part as a way of avoiding marine predators.

References

simplicirrus
Taxa named by Victor G. Springer
Fish described in 1971